Tianjin No. 47 High Schoolis located on China National Highway 103 in Beichen District, Tianjin, China.

History
Sometime in the early 1950s, Yang Yupu proposed that a senior high school be built in the Beichen District. Yang Yupu was the father of Yang Liandi and the Municipal People's Representative of Tianjin. The school was established in 1954 as the first suburban Middle School and was financially supported by the government. In 1978, it was confirmed as one of the 19 top senior High Schools in Tianjin.

The school was split into two in 1997, becoming Huachen Middle School and Tianjin No. 47 High School. In 2002 the High School section relocated and it became a demonstration school. In 2012, Peking University ranked it as one of the best senior High Schools in China.

Notes

1954 establishments in China
Educational institutions established in 1954
High schools in Tianjin